Eduard Marian Ilie (born 29 June 1986), better known by his stage name Edward Maya, is a Romanian DJ, musician, composer, record producer, performer, singer and songwriter, most famous for his 2009 smash hit single "Stereo Love".

Career
In and around 2006, Maya worked with many other Romanian artists such as Akcent and Vika Jigulina. He also worked on the song Tornerò, which was performed by Mihai Trăistariu in the Eurovision Song Contest 2006. He added in an interview on Beat-Town.com that this song "was the beginning of my career"

In the summer of 2009, Maya launched his first song as an artist, "Stereo Love", reaching No. 2 in the Romanian singles charts. Later that year, "Stereo Love" became an international hit in clubs. While this success was followed by concerts worldwide, the song entered the top-5 singles charts in Austria, Denmark, Finland, France, Germany, Ireland, Italy, the Netherlands, Norway, Spain, Sweden, Switzerland, and the UK. "Stereo Love" has received over 539 million YouTube views as of November 2022.

On 13 May 2010, Maya released his second single "This Is My Life". To help maintain control of his career and provide opportunities for other artists, Maya has formed his own record label, Mayavin Records.

Maya released the song and video for his third single "Desert Rain" on Christmas night worldwide. In an interview Edward Maya talked about his Desert Rain tour he mentions he'll start off with India and later he will be touring Europe, US, South Africa and Pakistan. His fourth single "Mono in Love" was released on 29 November 2012 also featuring Vika Jigulina.

He graduated from George Enescu Music High School in Bucharest and is currently a final year student at the Bucharest Conservatory.

Maya was chosen to dub Grug voice in the animated movie Onward.

Discography

Studio albums

Singles

As lead artist

References

External links

Mayavin Records website

1986 births
Living people
Romanian dance musicians
Musicians from Bucharest
Progressive house musicians
21st-century Romanian male singers
21st-century Romanian singers
Romanian DJs
Electronic dance music DJs